Ilze Gribule (born 25 January 1984 in Krāslava) is a former female javelin thrower from Latvia. Her personal best throw is 58.74 metres, achieved in May 2005 in Riga.

Achievements

References

External links
 
 

1984 births
Living people
Latvian female javelin throwers
Athletes (track and field) at the 2004 Summer Olympics
Olympic athletes of Latvia
People from Krāslava